The Sweeting Homestead (also known as the Sweeting Plantation) is a historic site in Elliott Key (Biscayne National Park, Florida). On September 19, 1997, it was added to the U.S. National Register of Historic Places.

References and external links

 Dade County listings at National Register of Historic Places
 Sweeting Homestead at Elliot Key at Florida International University - Digital Collections Center

National Register of Historic Places in Miami
National Register of Historic Places in Biscayne National Park
1882 establishments in Florida